The Battle of Chester Station was fought on May 10, 1864, between Union and Confederate forces during the American Civil War. The Confederates attacked portions of Benjamin Butler's Union forces.

Background
The Action at Chester Station was a relatively minor battle of the Bermuda Hundred Campaign and ended indecisively. It started as a Union expedition against the Richmond & Petersburg Railroad. The object was to destroy the railroad in order to cut the line of communication. It was met by a reconnaissance-in-force of two Confederate brigades led by Major General Robert Ransom, who attacked south from Drewry's Bluff near the Winfree House. Both sides fought gallantly and fiercely including hand-to-hand.

Battle

When the Federal (Union) troops reached the vicinity of Chester Station they were divided into two wings. The left wing, commanded by Maj. O. S. Sanford of the 7th Connecticut Infantry, moved up the railroad toward Chester Station, where the 6th Connecticut Infantry was engaged in tearing up the track, and remained there for about an hour, when orders came to join the other column on the turnpike below. Here the right wing, commanded by Col. C. J. Dobbs of the 13th Indiana Infantry, had encountered a force of Confederates too large to overcome, and Dobbs sent back for reinforcements. In the meantime he formed line of battle with his own regiment on the left, the 169th New York Infantry on the right, one section of the 1st Connecticut battery in front, supported by a detachment of the 67th Ohio Infantry, and awaited the onset. The Confederates, with infantry, cavalry and artillery, advanced, and when they were within easy range Dobbs gave the command to fire. A tremendous volley from his entire line checked the Confederate advance, and a second threw them into confusion, compelling them to retire for the purpose of reforming their lines. At this juncture Sanford arrived with the left wing and went into position with the 6th Connecticut Infantry on the right of the road and the 7th on the left as supports to the advanced lines. Two companies of the 7th Connecticut Infantry were sent forward to support a battery, and the remainder of the regiment moved up to the top of the hill and opened fire on the Confederate's left, driving them back to the woods. One of the guns of the 4th New Jersey battery was abandoned by the men, and an effort to capture this piece was thwarted by this regiment, Sanford sending Lieut. Barker with Co. K to bring in the gun, which he did in the face of a galling fire. The 7th New Hampshire Infantry came up and went into position just as the Confederates advanced again, having been reinforced, and again they were allowed to come within easy range, when they were greeted with a murderous fire from both artillery and infantry. This settled the contest. After a vain endeavor to rally the shattered ranks the Confederate officers gave up the attempt and sought the cover of the woods. Gen. A. H. Terry, commanding the 1st division, 10th corps, arrived on the field after the action had begun, and during the latter part of the engagement directed the movements of the Union troops.

Aftermath
Gen. Terry reported the Union loss as being 280 in killed, wounded and missing, and estimated that of the Confederates as at least twice that number, some 50 prisoners remaining in the hands of the Federals.

The return of casualties in Barton's Brigade showed a total of 249 in killed, wounded and missing, including the loss of a commanding officer of one of his regiments, Lt. Col. Joseph R. Cabell of the 38th Virginia Infantry.

Two Confederate brigades faced an Ohio regiment, which was pushed back despite arrival of reinforcements from Drake's brigade. Confederate successes, while they had superior numbers, including the capture of one cannon (which was recovered by the Union forces), were halted when Hawley's brigade arrived on the field. The growing Union reinforcements started to outnumber them, and they were compelled to retire to Drewry's Bluff, while at the same time the Federals withdrew east to Bermuda Hundred. The result was a draw with neither side having surrendered, been defeated, or gained any ground. The Union forces succeeded in destroying some railroad track, and the Confederate forces succeeded in stopping them from doing any more damage. Maj. Gen. Ransom relieved Brig. Gen. Barton of his command, and Col. Voris was brevetted Brigadier General for meritorious service.

Order of battle

Union Forces

Department of Virginia and North Carolina
MG Benjamin F. Butler

MG Quincy A. Gillimore, commanding X Corps

Confederate Forces

Department of North Carolina and Southern Virginia
GEN P.G.T. Beauregard

MG Robert Ransom, commanding Department of Richmond

See also
Bermuda Hundred Campaign

Notes

References
The Union Army: Cyclopedia of battles, Volume 6, Federal Publishing Company, 1908, page 274.
Dwight, Theodore Frelinghuysen, General Butler's Bermuda Campaign, Papers of the Military Historical Society of Massachusetts, Volume 9, Military Historical Society of Massachusetts, 1912.
Cowles, Calvin Duvall, Report of Col. Cyrus J. Dobbs, Thirteenth Indiana Infantry, of operations May 10. The War of the Rebellion: A Compilation of the Official Records of the Union and Confederate Armies, United States War Records Office, Series 1 - Volume 36 (Part II), CHAP. XLVIII, page 110, Govt. Print. Off., 1891.
Cowles, Calvin Duvall, Report of Col. Alvin C. Voris, Sixty-seventh Ohio Infantry, of operations May 9-10, 1864. The War of the Rebellion: A Compilation of the Official Records of the Union and Confederate Armies, United States War Records Office, Series 1 - Volume 51 (Part I), Chapter LXIII, page 1224 Govt. Print. Off., 1891.
Cowles, Calvin Duvall, Report of Brig. Gen. Seth M. Barton, C. S. Army, commanding brigade, of operations May 10. The War of the Rebellion: A Compilation of the Official Records of the Union and Confederate Armies, United States War Records Office, Series 1 - Volume 36 (Part II), CHAP. XLVIII, page 213, Govt. Print. Off., 1891.
Cowles, Calvin Duvall, Report of Col. George K. Griggs, Thirty-eighth Virginia, Infantry, of operations May 3–27. The War of the Rebellion: A Compilation of the Official Records of the Union and Confederate Armies, United States War Records Office, Series 1 - Volume 36 (Part II), CHAP. XLVIII, page 235, Govt. Print. Off., 1891.

Attribution
 This article contains text from "The Union Army: Cyclopedia of battles", Volume 6, Federal Publishing Company, 1908 a text now in the public domain.

Further reading
Salmon, John S., The Official Virginia Civil War Battlefield Guide, Mechanicsburg, PA: Stackpole Books, 2001. .
Lowry, Don No turning back: the beginning of the end of the Civil War : March–June 1864, Volume 1, Hippocrene Books, 1992.
Robertson, William Glenn, Back door to Richmond: the Bermuda Hundred Campaign, April–June 1864, University of Delaware Press, 1987.

External links
The Bermuda Hundred Campaign
The Bermuda Hundred Campaign 
The Troy Times, MAY 16, 1864.
The New York Times, Wednesday, May 11, 1864.
National Park Service battle summary
Battle of Chester Station Historical Marker
Battle of Chester Station Historical Marker
Chester Station Fight Historical Marker
Chester Station Camp #1503 Sons of Confederate Veterans
Virginia Civil War Trails
CWSAC Report Update

Bermuda Hundred campaign
Battles of the Eastern Theater of the American Civil War
Inconclusive battles of the American Civil War
Conflicts in 1864
1864 in Virginia
Battles of the American Civil War in Virginia
Chesterfield County in the American Civil War
May 1864 events
American Civil War orders of battle